Events from the year 1900 in the United Kingdom.

Incumbents
 Monarch – Victoria
 Prime Minister – Robert Gascoyne-Cecil, 3rd Marquess of Salisbury (Coalition)
 Parliament – 26th (until 25 September), 27th (starting 3 December)

Events

January
 3 January – royal yacht Victoria and Albert almost  blows up while being floated out of dry dock at Pembroke Dock on completion of her construction.
 9 January – influenza outbreak in London.
 24 January – Second Boer War: Boers repel British troops under General Sir Redvers Buller at the Battle of Spion Kop.
 31 January – the Gramophone Company copyrights the His Master's Voice illustration.

February
 5 February – the UK and the United States sign a treaty for the building of a Central American shipping canal through Nicaragua.
 6 February – the House of Commons vote of censure over the government's handling of the Second Boer War is defeated by a majority of 213.
 8 February – Second Boer War: British troops are defeated by Boers at Ladysmith, South Africa.
 12 February – meeting held at Mile End to protest against the Boer War ends in an uproar.
 14 February – Second Boer War: in South Africa, 20,000 British troops invade the Orange Free State.

 27 February
 Boer War: in South Africa, British military leaders receive an unconditional notice of surrender from Boer General Piet Cronjé.
 Creation of the Labour party; Ramsay MacDonald is appointed its first secretary.
 28 February – Second Boer War: the 118-day Siege of Ladysmith is lifted.

March to September
 March–September – War of the Golden Stool fought against the Ashanti Empire.
 1 April – Irish Guards formed by Queen Victoria.
 4 April
 An anarchist shoots at the Prince of Wales during his visit to Belgium for the birthday celebrations of the King of Belgium.
 Queen Victoria arrives in Dublin on a rare visit.
 23 April–12 May – the Automobile Club of Great Britain stages a Thousand Mile Trial, a reliability motor rally over a circular route from London to Edinburgh and return.
 24 April – the Daily Express newspaper published for the first time.
 14 May–28 October – Great Britain and Ireland compete at the Olympics in Paris and win 15 gold, 6 silver and 9 bronze medals.
 17 May – Second Boer War – Siege of Mafeking ends.
 18 May – the UK proclaims a protectorate over Tonga.
 5 June – Boer War: British soldiers take Pretoria, South Africa.
 19–21 July – Bernard Bosanquet first bowls a googly in first-class cricket, playing for Middlesex against Leicestershire at Lord's.
 27 July – Louise, Princess Royal, a granddaughter of Queen Victoria, marries Alexander Duff, Earl of Fife, in the private chapel of Buckingham Palace, London; 2 days later he is created Duke of Fife, the last Dukedom created in Britain for a person who is not a son, grandson or consort of the Sovereign.
 30 July
 The Duke of Albany becomes Duke of Saxe-Coburg and Gotha as Carl Eduard following the death of his uncle, Duke Alfred, a son of Queen Victoria who is the third of the reigning monarch's children to die.
 Mines (Prohibition of Child Labour Underground) Act prohibits children under the age of thirteen from working in mines.
 8 August – Great Britain loses to the United States in the first Davis Cup tennis competition.
 14 August – an international contingent of troops, under British command, invades Peking and frees the Europeans taken hostage.
 27 August – British defeat Boer commandos at Bergendal.
 3 September – West Bromwich Albion F.C. move into The Hawthorns, a new stadium on the border of West Bromwich and Handsworth.

October
 3 October – Edward Elgar's choral work The Dream of Gerontius receives its first performance, in Birmingham Town Hall.
 25 October – Second Boer War: United Kingdom annexes Transvaal.

November
 22–14 November 1903 – strike of Welsh slate workers at Penrhyn Quarry.

December
 3 December – the Conservative Party under Lord Salisbury wins the 'Khaki' general election. Winston Churchill is elected Member of Parliament for Oldham; and two Labour candidates are successful: Keir Hardie in Merthyr Tydfil and Richard Bell in Derby.
 15 December – the three lighthouse keepers on Flannan Isle disappear without a trace
 28 December – the Liverpool barque Primrose Hill is wrecked on South Stack off Holyhead, with the loss of 33 lives.
 31 December – a storm causes a stone and a lintel to fall at Stonehenge; they are restored in 1958.

Undated
 Beer Scare: beer drinkers in North West England suffer poisoning from arsenic in brewing sugars: 6,000 people affected and 70 killed.
 William Harbutt of Bathampton begins commercial production of Plasticine modelling clay.
 Completion of the Arnold Cross estate, Shoreditch, London; Britain's first council estate to be commenced (10 years previously).
 Diamond Jubilee wins the English Triple Crown by finishing first in the Epsom Derby, 2,000 Guineas and St Leger, ridden by Herbert Jones.

Publications
 Ernest Bramah's oriental fantasy stories The Wallet of Kai Lung.
 Joseph Conrad's novel Lord Jim.
 Maurice Hewlett's historical novel The Life and Death of Richard Yea-and-Nay.
 Gertrude Jekyll's book Home and Garden: notes and thoughts, practical and critical, of a worker in both.
 Arthur Quiller-Couch's anthology The Oxford Book of English Verse 1250–1900.
 H. G. Wells' novel Love and Mr Lewisham.

Births

 1 January
 Roger Maxwell, film actor (died 1971)
 Lillian Rich, silent film actress (died 1954)
 2 January – Una Ledingham, physician, specialist in diabetes mellitus and pregnancy (died 1965)
 4 January – William Young, World War I veteran (died 2007)
 20 January – Dorothy Annan, painter, potter and muralist (died 1983)
 23 January – William Ifor Jones, composer (died 1988)
 6 February – Guy Warrack, Scottish-born conductor (died 1986)
 12 February
 Robert Boothby, politician (died 1986)
 Fred Emney, comic performer (died 1980)
 20 February – Bernard Knowles, cinematographer and screenwriter (died 1975)
 3 March
 Edna Best, stage, film and early television actress (died 1974 in Switzerland)
 Basil Bunting, modernist poet (died 1985)
 29 March – Margaret Sinclair, Scottish-born nun (died 1925)
 31 March – Prince Henry, Duke of Gloucester (died 1974)
 3 April – Albert Ingham, mathematician (died 1967)
 9 April – Mary Potter, painter (died 1981)
 19 April – Richard Hughes, novelist (died 1976)
 22 April – Nellie Beer, Conservative politician, Lord Mayor of Manchester (died 1988)
 24 April – Elizabeth Goudge, novelist (died 1984)
 25 April – Gladwyn Jebb, acting Secretary-General of the UN (died 1996)
 30 April – Cecily Lefort, World War II heroine, spy for SOE (executed 1945 in Germany)
 2 May – A. W. Lawrence, Classical archaeologist (died 1991)
 5 May – Harold Tamblyn-Watts, comic strip artist (died 1999)
 10 May – Cecilia Payne-Gaposchkin, astronomer and astrophysicist (died 1979 in the United States)
 27 May – Ethel Lang, née Lancaster, supercentenarian (died 2015)
 29 May – David Maxwell Fyfe, 1st Earl of Kilmuir, Scottish-born politician, lawyer and judge, Lord Chancellor (died 1967)
 30 May – Gerald Gardiner, Lord Chancellor (died 1990)
 6 June
 Arthur Askey, comedian (died 1982)
 Lester Matthews, actor (died 1975)
 17 June – Evelyn Irons, Scottish-born journalist, war correspondent (died 2000)
 25 June
 Philip D'Arcy Hart, medical researcher, pioneer in tuberculosis treatment (died 2006) 
 Louis Mountbatten, 1st Earl Mountbatten of Burma, Admiral of the Fleet and last Viceroy of India (assassinated 1979 in Ireland)
 26 June – John Benham, 400m runner (died 1990)
 30 June – James Stagg, Scottish-born meteorologist (died 1975)
 2 July
 Tyrone Guthrie, theatre director (died 1971 in Ireland)
 Sophie Harris, theatre and opera costume and scenic designer (died 1966)
 10 July – Evelyn Laye, actress (died [1996)
 4 August – Elizabeth Bowes-Lyon, queen consort of George VI and later Queen Elizabeth The Queen Mother (died 2002)
 17 August – Vivienne de Watteville, adventurer (died 1957)
 19 August – Gilbert Ryle, philosopher (died 1976)
 23 August – Bella Reay, footballer (died 1979)
 27 August – Frank Moody, Welsh boxer (died 1963)
 25 August – Isobel Hogg Kerr Beattie, Scottish architect (died 1970)
 4 September – Maxwell Knight, spymaster and naturalist (died 1968)
 8 September – Tilly Devine, organised crime boss (died 1970 in Australia)
 9 September – James Hilton, novelist and screenwriter (died 1954 in the United States)
 11 September – Jimmy Brain, footballer (died 1971)
 12 September – Eric Thiman, composer (died 1975)
 1 October – Tom Goddard, cricketer (died 1966)
 2 October – Isabella Forshall, paediatric surgeon (died 1989)
 6 October – Stan Nichols, cricketer (died 1961)
 8 October – Geoffrey Jellicoe, landscape architect (died 1996)
 9 October – Alastair Sim, character actor (died 1976)
 14 October – Roland Penrose, Surrealist painter and art collector (died 1984)
 16 October – Edward Ardizzone, painter, printmaker and author (born in Vietnam; died 1979)
 5 November – Ethelwynn Trewavas, ichthyologist (died 1993)
 18 November – Mercedes Gleitze, distance swimmer (died 1981)
 20 November – Helen Bradley, painter (died 1979)
 22 November – Tom Macdonald, Welsh journalist and novelist (died 1980)
 4 December – John Axon, railwayman hero (killed in accident 1957)
 16 December – V. S. Pritchett, short story writer (died 1997)
 17 December – Mary Cartwright, mathematician (died 1998)
 22 December – Alan Bush, pianist, composer and conductor (died 1995)
 26 December – Evelyn Bark, humanitarian, leading member of the Red Cross, first female recipient of the CMG (died 1993)
 Robina Addis, pioneering professional psychiatric social worker (died 1986)
 Saira Elizabeth Luiza Shah, born Elizabeth Louise MacKenzie, Scottish writer as Morag Murray Abdullah (died 1960)

Deaths

 20 January
 R. D. Blackmore, novelist (born 1825)
 John Ruskin, writer and social critic (born 1819)
 21 January – Francis, Duke of Teck, a cousin-in-law of Queen Victoria (born 1837)
 22 January – David Edward Hughes, musician and professor of music (born 1831)
 31 January – John Sholto Douglas, 9th Marquess of Queensberry, nobleman and boxer (born 1844)
 6 February – Sir William Wilson Hunter, colonial administrator, statistician and historian (born 1840 in Scotland)
 23 February
 William Butterfield, architect (born 1814)
 Ernest Dowson, poet (born 1867)
 10 March –  George James Symons, meteorologist (born 1838)
 16 March – Sir Frederic William Burton, painter and curator (born 1816 in Ireland)
 24 April – George Douglas Campbell, 8th Duke of Argyll, politician (born 1823)
 4 May – Augustus Pitt Rivers, ethnologist and archaeologist (born 1827)
 28 May – Sir George Grove, writer on music and the Bible and civil engineer (born 1820)
 3 June – Mary Kingsley, explorer, in Cape Colony (born 1862
 14 June – Catherine Gladstone, widow of Prime Minister W. E. Gladstone and philanthropist (born 1812)
 30 July – Alfred, Duke of Saxe-Coburg and Gotha (Duke of Edinburgh), second eldest son of Queen Victoria, in Germany (born 1844)
 28 August – Henry Sidgwick, philosopher (born 1838)
 31 August – Sir John Bennet Lawes, agricultural scientist (born 1814)
 19 September – Anne Beale, novelist (born 1816)
 9 October – John Crichton-Stuart, 3rd Marquess of Bute, landed aristocrat, industrial magnate, antiquarian, scholar, philanthropist and architectural patron (born 1847)
 16 October – Sir Henry Acland, physician (born 1815)
 22 November – Sir Arthur Sullivan, composer (born 1842)
 29 December – John Henry Leech, entomologist (born 1862)
 30 November – Oscar Wilde, playwright, writer and poet, in France (born 1854 in Ireland)

See also
 List of British films before 1920

References

 
Years of the 19th century in the United Kingdom